Li Xian (Chinese: 李贤, Lǐ Xián, 502-569 CE) was a Northern Zhou general and Governor of Dunhuang. He was born in 502 CE in Guyuan, at the time under Northern Wei rule. As a soldier, he served the three dynasties of the Northern Wei, Western Wei, and Northern Zhou. Emperor Yuwen Tai entrusted him with the education of two of his sons during 6 years, as the imperial court had become too dangerous, and one of them, Yuwen Yong, would become Emperor Wu of Northern Zhou. Li Xian was in charge of defenses on the northern frontier of the Chinese Empire, in contact with the Silk Road. He died in Changan at the age of 66, in 569 CE. He was important enough to be mentioned in the Zhoushu and the Beishi. He was the great-grandfather of the famous Sui dynasty princess Li Jingxun.

His tomb, where he was buried with his wife Wu Hui (吴辉), was discovered in Guyuan in 1983 (北周李贤墓). The tomb was built in brick, and composed of a 42-meter sloping ramp leading to a square corbelled chamber. The walls of the whole structure were covered with paintings of officials, soldiers, servants, and musicians, but only a few have remained intact. Numerous small statuettes of servants and warriors were also found in the tomb (239 in total).

His epitaph suggests that his distant ancestors were of Tuoba-Xianbei, or possibly Turkic, descent. The epitaph of Li Xian contains the following line about his ancestry:

Although the epitaph states that Li Xian was descended from Li Ling, it also explains that his 10th generation ancestor was named Yidigui ("俟地归"), and that he had migrated south from the steppes across the Yin Mountains ("南越陰山"), so Li Xian himself had visibly not forgotten his origin from the northern steppes. According to the epitaph, Yidigui also was acquainted with the "Saint Emperor of the Wei" ("魏聖帝"), thought to be the Tuoba chieftain Tuoba Jiefen whose similar dynastic name was "Emperor Shengwu" (圣武皇帝), and who led the second Tuoba migration to the south.

Regardless of origin, the Chinese one-syllable name "Li" had been used at least since the time of his great-grandfather, who was Governor of Tianshui and "General of Pacifying the West" (laws had been passed forbidding Xianbei clothing at court, and demanding the adoption of Chinese one-syllable names during the 5th century CE). His tomb contained several Central Asian objects too, such as a ewer with Greco-Roman scenes. The grave also contained a sword with round pommel and scabbard-type attachement. According to the epitaph, he received a posthumous title: "Pillar of the State Great General" (柱国大将军)".

Li Xian claimed descent from the Longxi Li clan through the line of Li Ling. The Longxi Li were also claimed as ancestors by the imperial house of the Tang dynasty (618-907 CE) through a different line, though it was suggested in the 20th century that the Tang imperial house may have actually descended from an eastern lineage, the Zhaojun Li, who intermarried extensively with the "non-Chinese tribal aristocracy." The probable Tuoba-Xianbei origins of Li Xian as revealed by his epitaph has led to some scholars suggesting that the rulers of the Tang dynasty had mixed "barbarian" background, rather than being purely Han as suggested by official Tang records, and that they might have modified their genealogy to conceal their part Xianbei heritage while preserving various Xianbei customs.

See also
 Central Asian objects of Northern Wei tombs

External links
 Character 㩉
 Original report of the excavation: 《寧夏回族自治區博物館、寧夏固原北周李賢夫婦墓發掘簡報》〈1985年第十一期）"A brief report on the excavation of the Northern Zhou tomb of Li Xian and his wife at Guyuan in Ningxia"

References

502 births
569 deaths
Northern Zhou generals